Christian Chagnon (February 20, 1956 – December 9, 2021) was a Canadian handball player who competed in the 1976 Summer Olympics. Chagnon was born in Vaudreuil-Dorion, Quebec. He was part of the Canadian handball team, which finished eleventh in the 1976 Olympic tournament. He played all five matches and scored seven goals.

References
profile
Christian Chagnon's obituary 

1956 births
2021 deaths
French Quebecers
Canadian male handball players
Handball players at the 1976 Summer Olympics
Olympic handball players of Canada
People from Vaudreuil-Dorion
Sportspeople from Quebec